The Hackmatack National Wildlife Refuge is a newly established United States national wildlife refuge that will include noncontiguous properties, especially tallgrass prairie patches, wetland properties, and oak savanna parcels, located in the northwestern region of the Chicago metropolitan area and the southern part of the Milwaukee area.  The refuge's boundaries encompass parts of McHenry County, Illinois, and Walworth County, Wisconsin.  The refuge will be operated by the United States Fish and Wildlife Service, known as USFWS.  85 percent of the refuge will be in Illinois, and 15 percent in Wisconsin.

The refuge will cover 11,200 acres of land in Illinois and Wisconsin, which will complement 23,000 acres already acquired for public use or under environmental protection as of 2011.  Existing parklands adjacent to the proposed refuge's boundaries include several McHenry County Conservation District areas.

The name Hackmatack is an Algonquin term for the American tamarack or Larix laricina, a conifer formerly abundant in regional wetlands.  Hackmatack was the word used by many language groups in the Algonquin language group, including the Potawatomi, the tribe that most intensively utilized this ecosystem at the time this area was first mapped in the 17th and 18th centuries.

109 separate threatened or endangered species, including 49 species of birds, are listed within the area being studied for the proposed refuge designation.  Examples of endangered fauna that find a home within the boundaries of the proposed refuge include the Blanding's turtle.

History
The Hackmatack wetlands were a traditional home to the Potawatomi tribe of Native Americans of the United States, who utilized them for fishing, waterfowl hunting, and the gathering of plants used as food and medicine.

During the rapid population growth of the 20th century, many of the wetlands within the Hackmatack ecosystem were drained and altered for residential development, while others, such as Volo Bog State Natural Area near Fox Lake, Illinois, were preserved.

Current status
In October 2010, USFWS held four meetings, two each in Illinois and Wisconsin, to discuss plans for the proposed refuge.  In addition, the USFWS continued to accept public comments on the proposed refuge into 2011.  The USFWS stated that they expected to release a draft environmental assessment of the proposal in late spring 2011.

Following this comment procedure, the USFWS designated the proposed refuge for approval in August 2012.  The refuge will not be officially established until legal interest in lands are acquired, through purchase or donation.  The legal interest may encompass anything from fee simple ownership to conservation easement.  Purchase of land interest is dependent upon congressional approval and appropriation of funds.

Lands in Lake County, Illinois, Kenosha County, Wisconsin, and Racine County, Wisconsin were considered for inclusion in the new refuge, but were left outside its boundaries in the August 2012 announcement.

The State of Illinois announced acquisition of the first parcel land designated for inclusion in the new refuge, a 72-acre plot in northern McHenry County, in February 2013.  The acquisition was made for $511,000.  Acquisition of the land by a public-sector body triggered the completion of the legal act of creating the new refuge.

In 2018, the first 86 acres of the refuge opened in Wisconsin.

References

External links
 Hackmatack National Wildlife Refuge - official site at US Fish & Wildlife Service
 Friends of Hackmatack National Wildlife Refuge

Protected areas of McHenry County, Illinois
Protected areas of Walworth County, Wisconsin
National Wildlife Refuges in Illinois
National Wildlife Refuges in Wisconsin
Protected areas established in 2012
2012 establishments in Wisconsin
2012 establishments in Illinois